MADD Canada is the Canadian arm of Mothers Against Drunk Driving. Its stated purpose is to stop impaired driving and to support victims. MADD Canada operates public awareness and education programs which focus on preventing impaired driving. Local activities are carried out by chapters in approximately 100 communities across Canada.

The organization also supports a number of federal and provincial initiatives aimed at reducing incidents of impaired driving, including changes to Criminal Code provisions against drunk driving, and a zero blood alcohol content limit for drivers under 21.

Programs

MADD Canada's victim services programs support victims, train victim services volunteers, and deliver death notification training for medical, police, firefighter and victim services personnel.

The organization's youth services programs include a multimedia assembly presentation which tours Canadian high schools and is seen by approximately 750,000 students annually. The organisation also provides a classroom education tool called Breaking Point. 

MADD Canada runs several annual public awareness campaigns and fundraisers, including the "Strides for Change" walk-a-thon, and a door-to-door program, "Faces of MADD Canada", which operates in 13 local communities. "Project Red Ribbon" distributes red ribbons to Canadian motorists to signify the importance of not driving while impaired. Campaign 911 urges the public to call 911 if they see drivers they think may be impaired. MADD Canada also produces television and radio public service announcements across the country.

MADD Canada programs are supported through corporate and public donations. The organization also raises funds by selling breath mints, sold especially at pubs in the Toronto area.

In July 2021, MADD Canada CEO Andrew Murie called for Nova Scotia Premier Ian Rankin to take stronger action against drunk driving following Rankin’s apology for a previously undisclosed conviction for impaired driving. Previously, Saskatchewan Premier Scott Moe and British Columbia Premier Gordon Campbell had taken steps to curb impaired driving following revelations of their own previous charges.

In December 2022, MADD Canada partnered with the Fredericton Police Force on their annual Project Red Ribbon campaign, aiming to promote sober driving during the holiday season. In the same month, Fredericton police reported a four-year high in impaired driving arrests, totalling 199 as of December 16, up from 166 in 2021.

Allegations about fundraising

On December 9, 2006, an article in the Toronto Star alleged that about 19 cents of every dollar the organization raised went to victim services and combatting drunk driving. In response to this allegation, MADD Canada temporarily suspended its fundraising activities.

MADD CEO Andrew Murie argued that MADD's outreach campaigns also served to warn individual members of the Canadian public that impaired driving can lead to criminal charges, serious injury, and death and was thus not purely fundraising. Murie stated that the Canada Revenue Agency had audited MADD Canada in 2002-2003 and gave them a "clean bill of health". However, according to the Star's Kevin Donavan, a letter from the Agency dated March 3, 2003, stated that MADD had conflated fundraising with charity, and warned MADD not to count fundraising expenses as charitable expenditures.

See also
Impaired driving in Canada

References

External links
 MADD Canada

Charities based in Canada
Alcohol law in Canada
Political advocacy groups in Canada
Temperance organizations in Canada
Driving under the influence